53rd Regiment or 53rd Infantry Regiment may refer to:

 53rd (Napier's) Regiment of Foot, a unit of the British Army
 53rd (Shropshire) Regiment of Foot, a unit of the British Army
 53rd Sikhs (Frontier Force), a unit of the British Indian Army
 53rd (City of London) Heavy Anti-Aircraft Regiment, Royal Artillery
 53rd Anti-Aircraft Missile Regiment (Romania)
 53rd Coast Artillery Regiment, a unit of the United States Army
 53rd Infantry Regiment (Imperial Japanese Army)
 53rd Infantry Regiment (United States)
 53rd Coast Artillery Regiment, United States

American Civil War regiments:
 53rd Regiment Alabama Cavalry, a unit of the Confederate States Army
 53rd Illinois Infantry Regiment, a unit of the Union Army
 53rd Indiana Infantry Regiment, a unit of the Union Army
 53rd Regiment Kentucky Volunteer Mounted Infantry, a unit of the Union Army
 53rd Regiment Massachusetts Volunteer Infantry, a unit of the Union Army
 53rd Ohio Infantry, a unit of the Union Army
 53rd Pennsylvania Infantry Regiment, a unit of the Union Army
 53rd Wisconsin Volunteer Infantry Regiment, a unit of the Union Army

See also 
 53rd Division (disambiguation)